Al Musalla is a village situated in the northern region of the Kingdom of Bahrain, on the western outskirts of the capital city Manama. The villages lies under the Northern Governorate administrative region. The villages lies west of the village of Tashan and Khamis and north of Sehla.

The village is one of the most prominent villages in the country.  As with most villages in the country, the village was the site of clashes between anti-government protesters and police during the Bahrain uprising.

References

Populated places in the Northern Governorate, Bahrain